= Therapeutic support staff =

Therapeutic Support Staff (TSS) are special education assistants within the commonwealth of Pennsylvania. They are trained to provide therapy to students with attention deficit hyperactivity disorder, Tourette syndrome, autism, or other emotional support needs. A TSS meets with a child in a one-on-one situation, with family, in public or at school to provide therapy. They work with the student to improve in areas such as social skills, behavioral rehabilitation, speech, motor skills, appropriate gender expression, etc. TSS workers are often confused with a wrap around, which provide many of the same supportive therapies. A TSS worker has more in depth training and education on working with special needs, where a wraparound works mainly with children that have behavioral issues.
